The Qandil Mountains ( Çiyayên Qendîl), are a mountainous area of Kurdistan Region near the Iraq-Iran border. The region belongs to the Zagros mountain range and is difficult to access, with extremely rugged terrain. The highest peaks reach over 3,000m. 

The area is notable as a sanctuary and headquarters for the Kurdistan Workers' Party (PKK). Approximately 5,000 PKK and other armed factions control an area of roughly 50 km², which has been sporadically bombarded by the Turkish Air Force and shelled by Iranian military artillery for several years. The Kurdistan Free Life Party (PJAK) is also based in Qandil, which allows them to infiltrate into Iran.

See also
Kuhe Haji Ebrahim (highest peak)

References

External links 
 With the P.K.K. in Iraq’s Qandil Mountains by The New York Times
 Interviews with female PKK fighters in Qandil by BBC News
 Mount Qandil: A Safe Haven for Kurdish Militants – Part 1, Part 2
 

Zagros Mountains
Mountain ranges of Iraq
Erbil Governorate
Geography of Iraqi Kurdistan
Mountains of Kurdistan
Mountains of Iraq